The Endurance 100 was a hundred-mile (162 km) mountain bike race held annually in late August in Utah. The race was discontinued after the 2007 event.

See also
 Wilderness 101 Mountain Bicycle Race
 Mohican MTB 100
 Lumberjack 100
 Shenandoah 100
 Breckenridge 100

External links
 Team Health Fx Review of the E100

Mountain biking events in the United States
Endurance games
Cycle races in the United States